George Henry Seeley (1880–1955) was an American photographer primarily associated with the pictorialist movement.

Seeley was born in Stockbridge, Massachusetts and attended the Massachusetts Normal Art School from 1897 to 1901, as a student in painting. He studied under Joseph DeCamp, who encouraged his interest in natural light, and became interested in photography after meeting F. Holland Day. He returned to Stockbridge in 1902, where he worked in both painting and photography. In 1904, his photographs were included in the First American Photographic Salon in New York City, where Alfred Stieglitz encountered them; Stieglitz then invited Seeley to join the Photo Secession, in which Seeley was a member from 1906 to 1910.

After leaving Stieglitz's group, Seeley continued creating in a pictorialist aesthetic while the style as a whole declined in critical praise; this, coupled with wartime shortages in raw materials needed for photography, hurt Seeley's career as a photographer. While Seeley continued exhibiting his photographs until the 1930s, little of what was shown was new material. Later in life, Seeley returned to painting, and also served as a newspaper correspondent for a Stockbridge publication. He died there in 1955.

References

External links 

 George H. Seeley Papers and Photographs. Yale Collection of American Literature, Beinecke Rare Book and Manuscript Library.

1880 births
1955 deaths
People from Stockbridge, Massachusetts
20th-century American photographers
Photographers from Massachusetts
Massachusetts College of Art and Design alumni